Robert Lee (born 28 February 1956) is an Australian sprint canoeist who competed in the early 1980s. At the 1980 Summer Olympics in Moscow, he finished fifth in the K-2,500m event and eighth in the K-4 1,000m event.

References
Sports-Reference.com profile

1956 births
Australian male canoeists
Canoeists at the 1980 Summer Olympics
Living people
Olympic canoeists of Australia